King Dao of Chu (died 381 BC) was the king of the state of Chu from 401 BC to 381 BC during the early Warring States period of ancient China.  He was born Xiong Yi and King Dao was his posthumous title.

King Dao succeeded his father King Sheng of Chu, who died in 402 BC. He died after a reign of 21 years; his son, King Su of Chu, succeeded him.

References

Monarchs of Chu (state)
Chinese kings
4th-century BC Chinese monarchs
381 BC deaths
Year of birth unknown
5th-century BC Chinese monarchs